Ema Mualuvu (born 19 June 1999) is a Fijian netball player who plays for Fiji in the positions of goal defense or wing defense. She was included in the Fijian squad for the 2019 Netball World Cup, which was also her maiden appearance at a Netball World Cup.

References 

1999 births
Living people
Fijian netball players
2019 Netball World Cup players
Queensland state netball league players